Melaleuca glauca, commonly known as Albany bottlebrush is a plant in the myrtle family, Myrtaceae and is endemic to the south-west of Western Australia. (Some Australian state herbaria continue to use the name Callistemon glaucus. Lyndley Craven claims that there is no type material for Callistemon speciosus and includes it here as a synonym.) It is a tall shrub with glaucous leaves and spikes of red flowers in spring.

Description

The flowers are bright red and arranged in spikes on the ends of branches which continue to grow after flowering. The stamens are arranged in five bundles around the flower and there are between 6 and 15 stamens per bundle.

Taxonomy and naming
The Albany bottlebrush was first formally described in 1830 by the English botanist Robert Sweet, who gave it the name Callistemon glaucus and published the description in his book Hortus Britannicus. In 2013, Lyndley Craven changed the name to Melaleuca glauca and published the name change in Melaleucas : their botany, essential oils and uses.

In 1815 Aimé Bonpland described Metrosideros glauca but the name was not a validly published name (a nom. illeg.), having already been used by Georges de Courset in 1811. Callistemon glaucus is regarded as a synonym of Melaleuca glauca by the Royal Botanic Gardens, Kew.

The specific epithet (glauca) is from the Latin glaucus meaning "glaucous", referring to the leaves seen by Bonpland.

Distribution and habitat
Melaleuca glauca occurs in the south and south-western coastal districts of Western Australia between Perth and Albany in the Jarrah Forest, Swan Coastal Plain and Warren biogeographic regions, where it grows in swampy ground in sandy or clayey soils.

Conservation status
Melaleuca glauca is listed as "not threatened" by the Government of Western Australia Department of Parks and Wildlife.

Use in horticulture
Melaleuca glauca is widely grown as an ornamental (as Callistemon glaucus) in temperate parts of Australia.

References

glauca
Plants described in 1815
Endemic flora of Western Australia